The Remington Semi Automatic Sniper System (RSASS) is a semi-automatic precision rifle manufactured by Remington Arms.

Design and features
The RSASS was designed by Remington with help from JP Enterprises Company. The rifle is built with JP-made components including a left-side charging handle receiver and trigger group but is sold and supported by Remington. Remington offers the R11 RSASS rifle as a complete package, with a Leupold telescopic sight, a quick-detachable suppressor, a Harris bipod and a carrying case.

The rifle is based on the Stoner AR-10 system adapted to .308 caliber cartridges, with adjustable direct gas impingement operation and rotary bolt locking. The receiver is designed with a folding charging handle located on the left side, which facilitates more comfortable operation from prone position and does not reciprocate during firing. The barrel is made from stainless steel for maximum accuracy and fitted with a flash hider (when a suppressor is not used). Additional features include a fully adjustable Magpul stock and a flat-top style upper receiver with integral Picatinny rail. The rifle is fed using SR-25 pattern .308/7.62 magazines with 19- or 20-round capacities.

Use
The primary market for the RSASS is law enforcement and military as a designated marksman/sniper rifle. As of January 2013, the rifle is only available for Military/LEOs and not for civilian sales.

References

External links 
 Official Website

7.62×51mm NATO semi-automatic rifles
Sniper rifles of the United States
Remington Arms firearms